Mark Nichols may refer to:

 Mark Nichols (curler) (born 1980), Canadian curler
 Mark Nichols (American football) (born 1959), American football player
 Mark Nichols (golfer) (born 1965), English golfer
 Mark Nichols (composer) (born 1964), American playwright, composer and lyricist
 Mark Nichols (journalist) (1873–1961), Canadian newspaper journalist and editor

See also
 Mark Nicholls (disambiguation)